This is a list of settlements on the River Tees in County Durham and North Yorkshire, England.

from source

Forest-in-Teesdale
Bowlees
Newbiggin, Teesdale
Middleton-in-Teesdale
Eggleston
Cotherstone
Barnard Castle
Startforth
Whorlton, County Durham
Wycliffe, County Durham
Ovington, County Durham
Winston, County Durham
Piercebridge
High Coniscliffe
Cleasby
Stapleton, Richmondshire
Croft-on-Tees
Dalton-on-Tees
Hurworth Place
Hurworth-on-Tees
Neasham
Eryholme
Sockburn
Girsby
Low Dinsdale
Low Worsall
Aislaby, County Durham
Yarm
Eaglescliffe
Preston-on-Tees
Thornaby-on-Tees
Stockton-on-Tees
Middlesbrough

Settlements
River Tees
Tees